A Small Southern Enterprise is a 2013 Italian comedy film written, directed and starred by Rocco Papaleo. For their performances Giuliana Lojodice e Claudia Potenza were nominated for best supporting actresses at the Nastro d'Argento Awards. The film also received a David di Donatello nomination for best original song ("Dove cadono i fulmini" by Erica Mou).

Cast 
Riccardo Scamarcio as  Arturo
 Barbora Bobulova as  Magnolia
 Rocco Papaleo as Don Costantino 
 Sarah Felberbaum as  Valbona
  Claudia Potenza  as  Rosa Maria
 Giuliana Lojodice as Mother Stella
 Giovanni Esposito as  Raffaele
  Susy Del Giudice as  Maddalena
 Giorgio Colangeli as  Emanuele
  Giampiero Schiano as  Jennifer

References

External links 

2013 comedy films
2013 films
Italian comedy films
Films shot in Sardinia
2010s Italian-language films
2010s Italian films